Shentu  or Shenshu and Yulü or Yulei are a pair of deities in Chinese mythology who punished evil spirits by binding them in reed ropes and feeding them to tigers. Their images together with reed rope seasonally adorned the doors or gates to ward off evil, and are considered the earliest examples of Menshen ('gate deities' or 'door gods') venerated under such practice. Later traditions identified other gods or deified people as gate deities.

The description dates to writings from the 1st and 2nd centuries AD, during the Eastern Han dynasty, and the attribution to the Classic of Mountains and Seas dating much earlier appears to be spurious.

Early sources 
The earliest record of Shentu and Yulü occurs in a passage quoted from Shanhaijing (Classic of Mountains and Seas) in Wang Chong (d., c. 97 AD)'s Lunheng ("Discourses in the Balance"), although the passage is not found in surviving recensions of the Shanhajing, and the attribution to the earlier work is disputed.

The passage records the myth that two gods Shentu  (or Shenshu) and Yulü stand upon a giant peach tree that "twists and coils as far as 3000 li". At the tree's north-east was the ghost gate (also 'gate of the spirits of the dead [demons]'). At the ghost gate, the two gods inspected the transit of countless dead spirits, and the evil-deeded ones they bound with reed rope and fed to tigers. This gave rise to the custom, allegedly set forth by the Yellow Emperor (Huangdi), that at the change of seasons, giant peachwood dolls shall be erected, the two gate gods and the tiger be painted on doors, and a reed rope be left to hang, in order to ward against evil.

The account is repeated with slightly differing wording elsewhere and instead of invoking the legendary Hunagdi, it is stated that the "district office" (i.e., the Han Dynasty administration) practices the use of peachwood figures and gate paintings for apotropaic use.

Cai Yong ( d. 192)'s Duduan, ('Soitary decisions[?]' on ceremonial matters) is another source  which contains a mostly identical passage, and another corroborative source of this period, Ying Shao's Fengsu Tongyi ( 195) also provides a similar description. These sources add that the decorations are put up on New Year's Eve, or to quote more literally "the night before the La rites" (La 臘; held at the end of the year; precursor of Laba Festival). The peach figures, also called taogeng are wood carvings.

This legend has been commented on as the traceable origin myth for the cult of the posting of the Menshen gate deities, and in later times, different deities have superseded them as gate gods to a large measure, but regionally, Shentu and Yulü still continue to be employed as the New Year's guardian gate gods.

Later history 
The carven peachwood figures (taogeng, etc.) were later simplified using peachwood boards, known as peach[wood] charms (taofu), and portraits of Shentu and Yulü were drawn on the boards, or their names written on them.

Later in the 8th century, it has been held the Taizong of the Tang Dynasty (second emperor and co-founder of dynasty) appointed his generals Qin Qiong and Yuchi Gong to serve as personal bodyguards to protect him from evil spirits, which later led to the popular custom of using the generals as the gate deities. However, by the 9th century, they were replaced by Zhong Kui, the famed ghost catcher (demon-queller).

couplets (lian) began to be written on the taofu boards around the 10th century.

The taofu, according to a 13th-century description, was a thin planks 4–5 cun (≈inches) wide and 2–3 chi (≈feet) long, inscribed with the name of Yulü on the left and Shentu on the right, garnished with pictures of deities and mythical beasts, the lion-like  and the ox-like baize. Spring (New Year) greetings and  words were also added to it. The boards were replaced every new year.{{Refn|Chen Yuanjing (13c.), Suishiguangji (“Extensive records of the [Four] Seasons”), Book Five, article on "xietaopan  ". Cited by }}

The Qing Dynasty period scholar Yu Zhengxie (Guisi cungao 癸巳存稿, Book 13) conjectured that originally there were not two door  gods, but perhaps one, though this was evidently based on a misinterpretation of the quote from a classic work. But the question of 1 god or 2 as a moot argument for Yu, whose main thesis was that the gate gods Shentu and Yulü originated from the concept of the "peachwood mallet/hammer" (taozhui or taochui'').

Explanatory notes

References
Citations

Bibliography

 
 
 

Deities in Taoism
Architecture in China
Chinese architectural history
Chinese culture
Chinese gods